Metahexamide (INN) is an anti-diabetic drug from the group of sulfonylureas. It is long-acting and belongs to the first-generation cyclohexyl-containing sulfonylureas. It was first described in 1959.

References

Potassium channel blockers
1-(Benzenesulfonyl)-3-cyclohexylureas